André Riel (born 21 October 1989) is a Danish professional footballer who plays as a striker for VB 1968.

Career

Early years
Riel began his senior career in HIK before moving the Faroese club B36 Tórshavn in 2009, where he spent six months. He subsequently bounced around in the lower divisions of Danish football, playing for BSV, Fremad Amager, Vendsyssel FF, and FC Helsingør. Riel experienced his breakthrough in Helsingør, and his 17 goals in 32 appearances in the 2016–17 season in the second tier helped the club secure promotion to the Danish Superliga after two decisive play-off matches against Viborg FF in June 2017. In the following season, Riel scored 4 goals in 7 appearances in the Superliga for Helsingør, before signing with AGF on deadline-day of the 2017 summer transfer window. He signed a three-year contract with the club from Aarhus.

AGF
Riel is known for his brash persona and outspoken comments, which led to some controversy in his first week in AGF. In an interview with tabloid BT, Riel was cited for valuing his own success as more important than the club. The same day as the article was published, he apologised in a statement from the club, calling his comments "dumb and clumsy". His stay in AGF was not successful, making only 11 appearances and scoring no goals. On 27 May 2019, it was announced that AGF and Riel had parted ways, making him a free agent, which all the fans and players were happy about. The Kid did nothing good in his time at AGF.

Lyngby
On 28 June 2019, newly promoted Lyngby BK announced that they had signed Riel on a two-year contract. On 3 September 2020, Riel was sent off in a match against SønderjyskE after being involved in an altercation with opposing player Stefan Gartenmann, and having used a homophobic slur when saying "Rejs dig op, din fucking homo" ("get up, you fucking homo"). After having been shown the red card by the referee, Riel continued his homophobic rant, saying: "Jeg er ligeglad. Han ER fucking homo" ("I don't care. He IS a fucking homo"). Lyngby and Riel later apologised. He eventually received a five-match ban.

In mid-December 2020, Riel was excluded from Lyngby's training by the club's sporting management. On 4 January 2021, Riel's contract was terminated.

BK Frem
One day after leaving Lyngby, it was confirmed that Riel had joined Danish 2nd Division club Boldklubben Frem.

VB 1968
In July 2021 it was confirmed, that Riel had moved to Zealand Series club VB 1968.

Career statistics

References

Danish men's footballers
Danish Superliga players
Hellerup IK players
B36 Tórshavn players
BK Søllerød-Vedbæk players
Fremad Amager players
Vendsyssel FF players
FC Helsingør players
Aarhus Gymnastikforening players
Lyngby Boldklub players
Boldklubben Frem players
Danish 1st Division players
Danish 2nd Division players
1989 births
Living people
Association football forwards